Veli Ağbaba (born 3 April 1968) is a Turkish politician from the Republican People's Party (CHP), who has served as a Member of Parliament for Malatya since 12 June 2011.

Early life and education 
Veli Ağbaba was born in Yazıhan, Malatya Province on 3 April 1968 as the son of Hüseyin and Elif Ağbaba. He completed his high school education in Malatya at Turan Emeksiz High School. He graduated from Anadolu University in 1989. In his youth, Ağbaba founded the Anadolu University Student Association. He is married with three children.

Political career 
Ağbaba joined Social Democratic Populist Party (SHP) in 1993 after his military service. He served as a Malatya Municipal Councillor between 1994 and 1999. In the local elections of 18 April 1999, Ağbaba was elected Republican People's Party (CHP) Provincial President.

Member of Parliament 
Ağbaba was elected as a CHP Member of Parliament for Malatya in the 2011 general election. He was re-elected in June 2015 and November 2015. He is member of the Atatürkist Thought Association, a secular organization that espouses the ideas of Mustafa Kemal Atatürk, the founder of modern Turkey.

A report that up to 400 workers had been killed during the construction of the new Istanbul Airport prompted Ağbaba to lodge a written questionnaire to the Turkish parliament on 13 February 2018.

Books authored 
 Balyoz Kumpası
 Kalemi Kırılan Gazeteciler

References

External links 
https://twitter.com/veliagbaba

1968 births
Living people
Anadolu University alumni
Contemporary Republican People's Party (Turkey) politicians
Social Democratic People's Party (Turkey) politicians
Deputies of Malatya